Joseph René Vilatte (January 24, 1854 – July 8, 1929), also known religiously as Mar Timotheus I, was a French–American Christian leader active in France and the United States. He was associated with several Christian denominations before his ordination as a priest by a Christian Catholic Church of Switzerland (CKS) bishop at the request of an Episcopal Church (USA) bishop for service in an Episcopal diocese. Eventually, he was reconciled with the Roman Catholic Church and voluntarily entered under a solemn vow of abjuration.

Vilatte was later consecrated as a bishop by Malankara Church bishops, with the knowledge and permission of the Syriac Orthodox Patriarch of Antioch.

Although never a bishop within an Old Catholic denomination or sect and denounced by the Union of Utrecht Old Catholic churches, Vilatte became known as the "first Old Catholic bishop of the United States".

Early life and conversion to Roman Catholicism 

Vilatte was born in Paris, France, on January 24, 1855. He was raised by his paternal grandparents, who were members of the Petite Église (PÉ), an independent church separated from the Roman Catholic Church after the Concordat of 1801. Vincent Gourdon wrote that this independent church had about 4,000 adherents  Peter Anson, in Bishops at large, says that Vilatte's parents were members of the independent church and that he was probably baptized by a layman. Boyd, however, claims that Vilatte was validly baptized and educated by parents who held Gallican beliefs. Some accounts say that Vilatte was born Roman Catholic.

Vilatte lost his parents at a "tender age". Raised in a Parisian orphanage operated by the Brothers of the Christian Schools where he was conditionally baptized, he received the sacrament of confirmation in Notre Dame de Paris cathedral. His sister became an Augustinian nun, and was evicted from Montrouge, Paris, convent during the enforcement of the 1905 French law on the Separation of the Churches and the State.

Not yet sixteen, Vilatte served during the Franco-Prussian War in the battalion of the National Guard militia commanded by Jules-Henri-Marius Bergeret, a future member of the Comité de vigilance de Montmartre. He intended to become a Roman Catholic priest but, after the war and the Paris Commune, Vilatte emigrated to Canada. There he became a member of the Protestant Methodist Church in Montreal. He worked for two years as a teacher and lay assistant to a French mission priest. He worked as a catechist in a small school near Ottawa and led services.

He took refuge in Belgium. He spent one year in the House of the Christian Brothers at Namur. Vilatte emigrated to Canada again in 1876.

Vilatte spent a second year devoted to private preparation for the priesthood before entering, in 1878, the Congregation of the Holy Cross Fathers' College of St. Laurent, Montreal, Canada. Marx and Blied wrote that he spent three years at the College of St. Laurent and left voluntarily. In the interval between his third and fourth seminary years, Vilatte attended several anti-Catholic lectures by Charles Chiniquy, a priest who left Roman Catholicism and became a Presbyterian pastor. Vilatte began to have doctrinal doubts.

Chiniquy, a French Canadian, was known as a gifted public speaker. Yves Roby, in the Dictionary of Canadian Biography, compared Chiniquy to French Bishop Charles Auguste Marie Joseph, Count of Forbin-Janson, of Nancy and Toul, in his "spectacular preaching methods", and wrote that Chiniquy's preaching produced "genuine religious transformation". Chiniquy was dubbed the apostle of temperance. "Even some Protestants became indignant", according to Roby, at how for five years "Chiniquy conducted an unremitting campaign" of "unrestrained attacks on the Catholic Church, its dogmas, sacraments, moral doctrine, and devotional practices".

Nicholas Weber, in the Catholic Encyclopedia, wrote that Vilatte became an apostate chiefly due to the influence of Chiniquy.

According to Ernest Margrander, in the Schaff–Herzog Encyclopedia of Religious Knowledge, Vilatte was unable to continue his seminary studies and transferred to The Presbyterian College, Montreal. Two years' study convinced him of both papal additions to a primitive Catholic faith and defective Protestant interpretation of its traditional teachings. By contrast, Anson says there is "no record of Vilatte as a student" at Presbyterian College.

In an 1889 article, John Shea wrote in The American Catholic Quarterly Review that Vilatte was unwilling to leave Roman Catholicism. He entered a house of the Alexian Brothers, and became a cook among the Clerics of Saint Viator at Bourbonnais Township, Kankakee County, Illinois. But he stayed only six months.

Vilatte became reacquainted with Chiniquy, who lived in nearby St. Anne, Illinois. Chiniquy advised him to begin missionary work among a group of French and Belgians in Green Bay, Wisconsin, who had abandoned the Catholic Church in Rome. In April 1884, he was appointed by the Presbyterian Church in the United States of America (PCUSA) Board of Home Missions as pastor of a French-language mission in Green Bay. Although Vilatte did not succeed to any extent, according to Shea, he was ordained as a Presbyterian minister in August. When he made an addition to his chapel, he invited Chiniquy to come and dedicate it. This seemed to close his career as a Presbyterian.

Chiniquy introduced Vilatte to Hyacinthe Loyson, a former Carmelite priest who had been excommunicated in 1869. Loyson married in London in 1872. According to Cross, "Loyson was too profoundly Catholic to associate with such extremists." Marx and Blied identified Loyson as the source of Vilatte's interest in the Old Catholics' schism.

The  (ECG), founded by Loyson in 1879, was "the Paris mission established under the auspices of the Anglo-Continental Society [ (ACS) ] with oversight of a bishop of the Scottish Episcopal Church" and "a bridgehead in a culture war which had been waged by Anglicans". The endeavor "was one of a number of Anglican reform mission interventions in Roman Catholic heartlands" among the culture wars that were being fought in Germany, Haiti, Italy, Mexico, Portugal, Spain, and Switzerland. Loyson collaborated with the  "in his effort to recall Frenchmen to the principles and practices of the ancient Galilean Church before it was corrupted by Papal innovations." The  was an ecumenical organization which saw the "hope of Christian Europe appears to rest on the progress of a de-Vaticanised Catholicism and a de-rationalised Protestantism." Robert Nevin, the Episcopal Church (USA) rector in Rome, "seems to have been present at every juncture in the planning" and "appears to have been, with [Frederick] Meyrick, the principal strategist in winning Anglican Episcopal backing." According to Peter-Ben Smit, in Old Catholic and Philippine Independent Ecclesiologies in History, Loyson "was a source of concern" for the Union of Utrecht's (UU) International Old Catholic Bishops' Conference (IBC) because "the Dutch did not want to have anything to do with him and others could not." It was ceded to the archdiocese of Utrecht in 1893, although most parishioners were Gallican Catholics.

Shea wrote that, the Old Catholics' schism in the United States, originated with and was managed by the Episcopal Church (USA). Loyson directed Vilatte, to apply to Episcopal bishop John H. Brown of Fond du Lac, Wisconsin, the nearest Anglo-Catholic bishop. Marx and Blied wrote that Loyson was a proponent of the branch theory within Anglicanism when "Vilatte met Loyson", and Margrander wrote that Loyson wanted to personally talk with Vilatte regarding Catholic reform in America, and proposed that Vilatte travel to Europe for ordination as priest by a Christian Catholic Church of Switzerland (CKS) bishop, Eduard Herzog of Bern, Switzerland. In 1890, Loyson denied personally knowing Vilatte. Marx and Blied did not known if the two also met during Loyson's second, 1893–1894, American tour.

Episcopal and Old Catholic 

There were two notable missions in the Episcopal Diocese of Fond du Lac, one to the Germans under the leadership of Karl Oppen, formerly a Lutheran minister, the other to the French and Belgians on the Door Peninsula along the Green Bay of Lake Michigan, known as the Old Catholic Mission under the leadership of Vilatte. The Belgian settlement was spread out over parts of Brown, Door, Kewaunee counties. It stretched from the city of Green Bay, the county seat of Brown County, to the city of Sturgeon Bay, the county seat of Door County.
Brown's successor, Bishop Charles Chapman Grafton wrote: 

A feature of area was the number of nationalities represented; Shea described the Roman Catholic Diocese of Green Bay as one where the faithful were poor, scattered, and spoke too many languages. The bishop had to find priests able to give instructions and hear confessions in English, French, German, Dutch, Walloon, Bohemian, Polish, and Menominee, a nation of Native Americans living in Wisconsin. In a small congregation of a hundred families, a priest might find three languages necessary for the exercise of the ministry. It was not easy to obtain priests able to take charge of these missions, or to prevent their becoming discouraged when they found even the scanty allowance expected by a priest almost impossible. Grafton wrote that it had been said that nearly 70% of the population were foreigners or descendants of foreigners. Grafton also listed Swedes, Belgians, Norwegians, Danes, Icelanders, Bulgarians, Italians, Greeks, and Armenians. Grafton wrote that if the Episcopal Church was Catholic in its doctrine and worship it certainly could reach members of those several nationalities and supply their spiritual needs. The Episcopal Church planted in localities where most of the people were Swedes or Bulgarians or Belgians had found a footing and congregations had developed.

Brown had no use for Vilatte as an Episcopal priest, having no French Episcopalians for Vilatte to minister to.

A number of Roman Catholics situated in Door County, who were mostly Belgian, had broken away from the Holy See and had taken the position of Old Catholics.

Brown laid the situation before the Episcopal bishops in council. They agreed to let Brown take charge of the work as bishop and permitted the use there of the Old Catholic liturgy as used in Switzerland. The intention was to form a type of separate rite within the Episcopal Church. Brown informed Grafton of these facts and Bishop John Williams, the Presiding Bishop, also, when Grafton became bishop, he confirmed this intention.

A pamphlet published in connection with Vilatte's mission admitted to what Shea considered as fraud and dishonesty; Shea quoted:

Hjalmar Holand wrote, in History of Door County, Wisconsin, the County Beautiful, that "the term Episcopalian was not familiar to the Belgians [so] he represented himself as Old Catholic, a term which is sometimes used synonymously", according to Holand, "and has a more commendable sound to Catholic ears."

Vilatte followed Loyson's alternative advice to consult with Brown. Vilatte "had joined the Protestant Episcopal Church in America."

Priest 

Vilatte became, according to their official record, a candidate for Holy Orders in the Episcopal Diocese of Fond du Lac. Vilatte entered the Episcopal Diocese of Milwaukee's Nashotah House seminary in Nashotah, Wisconsin. According to the Journal of the eleventh annual council of the Protestant Episcopal Church in the Diocese of Fond du Lac, he was recommended as candidate for ordination as a priest in April 1885; and in May, he was recommended for ordination as a deacon; but, the journal does not note that during the annual council, June 2–3, 1885, he was in Europe and would be ordained within days. An unorganized mission called Good Shepherd, located in Fond du Lac, is mentioned but not associated with a missionary by name.

Brown sent Vilatte to Herzog. Shortly after the  synod in Bern, Vilatte arrived with dimissorial letters from Brown. Herzog was advised by Charles Reuben Hale to proceed. Herzog, acting for Brown and at his request "with a generosity which should never be forgotten in the annals of the American Church", ordained Vilatte within three days of his arrival. This was done "under peculiar circumstances" "to advance the candidate to the priesthood more speedily than the canons of the American Church permit." He was presented for ordination by Hale, "whose share in this transaction ought also gratefully to be remembered." His ordination took place in Bern's Old Catholic cathedral in the following order: minor orders and subdiaconate, June 5, 1885; diaconate, June 6, 1885; and, priesthood, June 7, 1885. Vilatte took his canonical oath of obedience to the Bishop of Fond du Lac. It was not until the next year, 1886, that his ordination, "at the request of the Bishop of Fond du Lac", is noted in the Journal of the twelfth annual council of the Protestant Episcopal Church in the Diocese of Fond du Lac. Without mentioning any dates, Brown said that Herzog, at Vilatte's ordination, "had pledged him to canonical obedience to the Bishop of Fond du Lac" and sent him "not as a missionary responsible to himself [...] but as a priest under the jurisdiction of the Bishop of this diocese." Brown then added Vilatte to the diocesan clerical list, as a missionary priest, and made "this public statement of the peculiar circumstances of the case." Grafton revealed years later, in the Journal of the fourteenth annual council of the Protestant Episcopal Church in the Diocese of Fond du Lac, that sending Vilatte to Bern "seemed [...] more expedient, as the Canons [...] would have compelled at least a year's delay in [...] Vilatte's ordination [...]"

Herzog ordained others in a similar way. Alexander Robertson described the case of Ugo Janni, in Campello and Catholic Reform in Italy. In 1889, Campello visited San Remo, on the Italian Riviera, as Robertson's guest where he was introduced to the syndic and "to many other persons of influence in the town" on his first visit. He visited a second time. "To secure as influential and representative an audience as possible, admission was made by tickets" to Campello's discourses held, with permission of the syndic, in the town theater. "All were, evidently, earnest students and followers of Mazzini", according to Robertson. Those supporters, in San Remo, decided to establish an exclusive church in San Remo. Robertson wrote that a "fact in connection with the San Remo church is this. All its members gave evidence of their Christian knowledge and character before they were admitted; and their admission was only given in answer to their own written application." It included "men of education, position, and influence." Robertson added that "the English visitors, who reside there during the winter, have, as a whole, taken a lively interest in Campello's movement, and have extended to it their support." Although Janni was only trained by Campello and evangelized in Arrone, "the time had come for him to receive ordination" so he "would then be in a position to organize a congregation at San Remo and administer the sacraments." Campello communicated on this matter with John Wordsworth, the Church of England's Bishop of Salisbury, "who, after fully satisfying himself as to the candidate's fitness by examination and by other ways", recommended Janni to Herzog, who then ordained him.

He divided the log cabin into a dwelling section and a chapel section. This was called the  mission, Little Sturgeon. Classified as an "unorganized mission" in the Episcopal Diocese of Fond du Lac,  was established in 1885 with Vilatte designated as the missionary priest taking charge on July 16, 1885. He received a missionary stipend. Grafton wrote that Vilatte was given charge of an Old Catholic mission, the property of the church and buildings belonging to the Episcopal Diocese of Fond du Lac. He was partly supported by funds from the Episcopal diocese, sat in council along with the other priests belonging to the diocese, and was visited by the bishop, who confirmed his candidates and was, like any other clergy, under the bishop's jurisdiction. It was listed as a rectory without a church or chapel or other property.  was reclassified for one fiscal year as a "non-reporting unorganized mission" and did not report financial data. Grafton wrote that Vilatte gave exaggerated reports about his work.

Cornelius Kirkfleet wrote, in The White Canons of St. Norbert, that after he was ordained, Vilatte erected a church and parsonage midway between two Roman Catholic parishes in Door County. In 1888,  was reclassified again as an "unorganized mission" with Vilatte designated as the missionary priest; that year, 1888, the Old Catholic Mission supported one married priest with his wife and child, two single priests, and two students. This was called the Precious Blood mission, Little Sturgeon (Gardner).

A spiritualist church was also built in 1888 and became a frequently visited stop on a traveling mediums circuit. It is located within  of the Precious Blood mission. Although it was admitted in 1888 as an "unorganized mission", the Precious Blood mission was reclassified for the first time as an "organized mission" in 1889, with Vilatte designated as the missionary priest taking charge, years earlier, on July 4, 1885; that year, 1889, the Old Catholic Mission supported two priests, one brother and two students.

Kirkfleet wrote that Vilatte's "'revised' religion spread rapidly in the peninsula" and obtained a foothold even in Green Bay. But Marx and Blied though "it never attained virility" among the Belgians.

Ducat wrote that the Shrine of Our Lady of Good Help became a place of Christian pilgrimage the importance of which grew steadily and contributed to maintaining the Catholic religion in a region plagued by heresy. Brise's reputed mystical visions became, over 150 years later, the first and only Marian apparition in the United States approved by a Roman Catholic diocesan bishop.

In 1890, Vilatte proposed to Grafton to be consecrated as a "bishop-abbot" to the American Old Catholics and as a suffragan bishop to Grafton; but the  canons did not allow for that and, as Grafton had no authority to do so, he refused Vilatte's request. Grafton thought Vilatte was neither "morally or intellectually fit for the office" of bishop.

Being ambitious to become a bishop, after Brown's death in 1888, Vilatte applied to the Old Catholic Church of the Netherlands (OKKN). He claimed that he was elected to the episcopate by the Old Catholic families themselves, at a synod held at the St. Mary's mission.

Marx and Blied wrote that "Vilatte wanted to function as a priest", so, "Katzer added that the Holy See would judge his orders and prescribe what theological studies he should make." Vilatte thanked Katzer for the letter and "remarked that he would prefer to see his flock Catholic rather than Protestant." Anson wrote that nothing further developed.

Grafton suspended Vilatte for six months after his council declared on March 31, 1891, that, in their opinion, "Vilatte abandoned the Communion of this Church and renounced its ministry."

Grafton consulted with Williams as to what he should do. Acting under Williams' advice, Grafton wrote to the  Archbishop Johannes Heykamp of Utrecht that he would transfer Vilatte, if Heykamp so wished, from his jurisdiction to that of Heykamp. In this way the  would be relieved of Vilatte and not responsible for having any connection with him. Grafton pointed out to Heykamp that all the property of the mission belonged to the Episcopal Diocese of Fond du Lac and was legally held by it. In case of his accepting Vilatte, Vilatte would be obliged to leave this work and Grafton would appoint a replacement. Heykamp wrote to Grafton that after he understood the situation between Vilatte and Grafton, he "had declined having any further correspondence" with Vilatte. The  declined accepting Vilatte. Vilatte witnessed the complete abandonment by his first congregation. The congregation of the Precious Blood mission was "unfaltering in its allegiance" to Grafton, as was Gauthier, and declared "the unity existing among themselves and their loyalty to the Diocese of Fond du Lac." When he left, Grafton wrote that Vilatte had lost the confidence of all their clergy and people.

An alternative narrative also can be found:

 Brown seized on this as a means of building a bridge with the Old Catholics in Europe and agreed to support Vilatte.

In 1888 Brown, who had supported Vilatte morally and financially, died and was succeeded by Grafton. Grafton, unlike Brown, did not favor Vilatte and conflicts soon arose. In order to correct the canonical situation created by Brown, Grafton demanded that Vilatte surrender ownership of his missions to the diocese which had paid for them in the first place; Vilatte complied in August 1890. Despite this, however, the relationship between the two deteriorated fast.

At the heart of the dispute was the conflicting vision for Vilatte's missions held by Vilatte and Grafton. Vilatte hoped that Grafton would continue Brown's policy of financing these missions in the hope of converting Roman Catholics to non-papal Old Catholicism and of using these missions as a springboard to founding the Old Catholic Church in North America. Grafton, on the contrary, wished to integrate these missions into his Episcopal diocese.

Adding to the dispute was Vilatte's refusal to break with the Franco-Belgians' adamant rejection of Anglican orders as invalid, while accepting the validity of Old Catholic orders; an attitude carried from Roman Catholicism. 

In the meantime Heykamp, hearing of Vilatte's difficulties with Grafton, wrote to him to disassociate himself from Episcopalians. In reply, Vilatte asked whether the  would consecrate him as the Old Catholic bishop for North America. 

He began correspondence with the Russian Orthodox bishop Vladimir Sokolovsky of Alaska and the Aleutian Islands.

When Grafton learned of these developments he published warnings to Episcopalians to stop supporting Vilatte. He also demanded that Vilatte cease operating from the Old Catholic missions owned by the Episcopal diocese. In response Vilatte announced in September 1890 that he was severing relations with the Episcopal Church (USA) and founded a new independent mission near Green Bay.

St. Anne Colony

Society of the Precious Blood 

The Society of the Precious Blood (SPB) was founded in 1887 in Wisconsin by Vilatte, under the name . There were French Canadians in the northern part of Door Peninsula who worked as laborers and foresters. It was an environment similar to Gatineau in Quebec, where Vilatte had worked as a teacher.

Others joined the church, including John B. Gauthier. He had been a teacher in Ottawa and in Illinois. After his ordination for the Precious Blood mission in 1889, he became master of novices and gave  a great impulse. He was a spiritual man and a good pedagogue. The children liked him and several became religious under his influence. Certain came with him to Quebec, to minister in the Berthier and Maskinongé counties and in Montreal. One of them was Stephen Côté, who was at the origin of the parish of Greater Montreal.

The Christian Catholic Church would not have developed as it did without the missionary activity of the religious of the Precious Blood. They preached Christ according to Scripture. Their goal is always to do pastoral work under this impulse. They were teachers and worked in Wisconsin.

Marx and Blied wrote that a letter "indicates that two self-styled sisters who operated among the Belgians were induced to join Vilatte for temporal benefits" and there was extremely little evidence that the women may have belonged to a Jansenist sisterhood of St Martha.

The  tried different formulas, including the Benedictine Abbey of St. Dunstan in Wisconsin (1908) under Dom Bernard Harding, and Vilatteville in Mexico,

Sturgeon Bay seminary 

In March 1887, Vilatte, pastor of the Precious Blood mission, visited The Independent newspaper office, in Sturgeon Bay, and informed the newspaper that: he had solicited funds for building a seminary and "secured several thousand dollars for commencing the work", plans were being made in Chicago, furnishings were secured, and "construction will be commenced in June". He was asked about his order and responded that the "order has a large number of adherents" in Europe and "is doubling every three years" in some of those countries. Curiously, the article did not mention the name of the order. In April, the Door County Advocate reported Vilatte visited Sturgeon Bay on April 25, 1887, to obtain a suitable location for the establishment of a college of his order. Although months earlier Vilatte said "construction will be commenced in June", by the end of May, the Door County Advocate reported, only that, he had "signified his willingness to establish a seminary in this city provided our people see fit to donate the required real estate", and that, a benefactor, who "will give the society other material aid if it is necessary to secure the institution for this city", donated  of land. In July, land "which has been purchased by the donations of our citizens" for the college, was transferred and work was to start on buildings in September. The next day the city council permitted "himself and family" to reside in a vacant school building; he was to operate a school in that building until his seminary was completed. In October, he began visiting cities along the East Coast of the United States "in quest of funds with which to erect the proposed seminary." He was away for several months. But a week after his return from touring the East Coast of the United States, Vilatte shocked Sturgeon Bay. His "contemplated seminary" would not be established there but elsewhere, wrote The Independent, in an article titled "Can this be true?" which exasperated that, "[t]he reasons given for this change are so extraordinary that we are not prepared to accept the statements made without further testimony." Vilatte wrote to Chris Leonhardt, President of the Business Men's Association, the group which facilitated the land purchase and aided him, that,

His letter was seen as a deleterious depiction of their community. The Independent editorialized:

Brown died within weeks of Vilatte's announcement, on May 2, 1888.

By 1889, his scheme was apparent and he was seen as a scoundrel; building a monastery or college, the Door County Advocate wrote, "at any rate is the talk" nevertheless "without ever accomplishing anything" substantial.

Emma de Beaumont, wife of Father Ernest, the Episcopal priest who assisted Vilatte since 1887, wrote to the Door County Advocate that, regardless whatever Vilatte had said, nothing had been done "toward building a college elsewhere" since Brown's death "upset whatever may have been the plan".

This project was never carried out and the land was returned to the donors.

Dyckesville 

A second congregation, classified as an "unorganized mission" in the Episcopal Diocese of Fond du Lac, was established in 1888 with Vilatte designated as the missionary priest taking charge on June 1, 1888. This was called the St. Mary's mission, Dykesville (Duvall). The Independent reported that Gauthier sailed to Europe where he would be ordained and that Vilatte received a letter from Heykamp "informing him that an [O]ld [C]atholic bishop will in a short time be selected to take charge of the [C]hurch in this country." He later received a gift of over 100 antique theology books, "many of them are more than two centuries old", from Heykamp and Jacobus Johannes van Thiel, of the Old Catholic seminary in Amersfoort.

Grafton attempted to remove Vilatte from the St. Mary's mission in 1891.

Herzog and Reinken's investigation concluded that Vilatte was an Episcopalian, according to Marx and Blied, Herzog wrote to Vilatte on March 24, 1891, and "ended his letter bluntly: 'I want to have nothing more to do with you'."

An anthology of correspondence excerpts was published, as Ecclesiastical Relations between the Old Catholics of America and Foreign Churches in response to an 1892 Second International Old Catholic Congress resolution. In Marx and Blied's opinion, this compilation was probably edited by Vilatte.

Russian Orthodox 

Isolated from both the Episcopalians and the Old Catholics, Vilatte turned once again to another denomination. The text of a widely republished and translated 1891 document, purportedly from the Russian Orthodox Church through Bishop Vladimir Sokolovsky of San Francisco and Alaska, announced Vilatte's conversion from an Old Catholic confession of faith to an Old Catholic Orthodox confession of faith under Russian Orthodox Church patronage. It also declared that only the Holy Synod of the Russian Church or Sokolovsky can prohibit or suspend Vilatte's religious functions; and, states that any action contrary to the declaration is null and invalid, based on the liberty of conscience and unspecified United States law but without mention of Russian Orthodox Church canon law. Sokolovsky "appears to have granted him some form of recognition", according to Brandreth. In 1891, Sokolovsky visited Vilatte at the St. Mary's mission. Margrander wrote that Sokolovsky intervened, approved Vilatte's confession of faith and his official acts, and referred him to the Holy Synod of the Russian Orthodox Church. He "found himself unable to accept these communities and permit the continued use of the Roman Catholic rites and customs." Sokolovsky was removed, soon after, in the wake of a series of scandals. Harding also corresponded with Russian General Alexander Kireev. However, "owing to the constitution of the Russian Church, Vilatte could not hope to obtain the episcopate from that source, or at least not without great difficulties."

While waiting for the Russian Holy Synod's decision, Vilatte also consulted with Malankara Orthodox Syrian Church Bishop Antonio Francisco Xavier Alvares. Alvares offered to come to America and consecrate him bishop; Vilatte responded that he would travel to Ceylon. Anson believed that Vilatte did not want Alvares to realize the diminutive size of the schism. After months of waiting for a decision from the Russian Holy Synod, Vilatte sailed to Ceylon to receive the offered episcopate.

Malankara Orthodox Syrian 

Susan Bayly wrote, in Saints, Goddesses and Kings, the St. Thomas Christians were by the 1880s fragmented and included a "bewildering array", based mostly on Christian evangelicalism, of "wildfire sects, breakaway churches and messianic Christian guru figures"; and, unlike in the past, they were then shunned as ritually polluting by caste Hindus. There was, and still is, a caste system among Indian Christians. To gain group status, they engaged in mass conversion campaigns, with a goal of increased adherents with maintained caste affiliation of the converts. For example, according to Bayly, baptized low caste Christians were "hived off into separate churches of their own" and not permitted to worship together. According to Robert Frykenberg, in Missions and Empire, there are at least six identified communities which claim apostolic tradition that are the historic Saint Thomas Christians.

Writing about the Syro-Malankara Catholic Church prior to its regaining Catholicity, William Richards wrote, in The Indian Christians of St. Thomas, that their history shows a constant effort to obtain bishops, of Syrian descent, in communion with the Holy See. Finally, in 1896, three Roman-Syrian priests were consecrated as titular bishops, and sent to Travancore and Cochin as vicars apostolic. All the Roman-Syrians are under these Metrans and they use the Syriac language in their churches. This is not the denomination that consecrated Vilatte.

Goanese schism in British Ceylon

The denomination that consecrated Vilatte was a part of the Malankara Orthodox Syrian Church that had a Latin Rite patrimony. V. Nagam Aiya wrote, in Travancore State Manual, that Alvares "describe[d] his Church as the Latin branch of the Syriac Orthodox Church of Antioch."

The Holy See sought to consolidate two co-existing jurisdictions, the Padroado jurisdiction and the Congregation for Propagation of the Faith jurisdiction. As part of the transition, churches served by Goan Catholic priests remained under the jurisdiction of the Patriarch of the East Indies until 1843. Later, this transition was delayed and extended until December 31, 1883. In British Ceylon, it ended in 1887 with the appearance of a papal decree that placed all Catholics in the country under the exclusive jurisdiction of the bishops of the island. That measure met resistance. Alvares and Dr. Pedro Manoel Lisboa Pinto founded in Goa, Portuguese India, an association for the defense of the Padroado. Bartas did not state if there was a response, but wrote that Alvares settled the difficulty by reinventing himself as the head of his schism, appearing on Ceylon, and settling into the main old Goan Portuguese churches in the village of Parapancandel. Alvares was a Roman Catholic Brahmin. Aiya wrote that Alvares, an educated man and the editor of a Catholic journal, was a priest in the Metropolitan Archdiocese of Goa. Later, he returned with title of Alvares Mar Julius Archbishop of Ceylon, Goa and the Indies, and involved about 20 parishes in the Roman Catholic Diocese of Jaffna and in the Roman Catholic Archdiocese of Colombo on the island in his schism.

Consecration

According to Marx and Blied, "several shady characters claim to have given him the information" about Alvares but Brandreth and others attribute Harding as the source. Vilatte "never had a sizable income" according to Marx and Blied but could accumulate money for travel. For example, the people of Dykesville donated $225 for his journey, and being elected bishop by his small flock (according to the records of the Episcopal Diocese of Fond du Lac, Vilatte had about 500 adherents), Vilatte sailed to Ceylon. There Alvares and two other Jacobite bishops consecrated him with the permission of the Patriarch of Antioch as Timotheos I, Jacobite Old Catholic Bishop of North America on 29 May 1892;
 attested to the consecration. When news of this reached North America the  excommunicated Vilatte.

Archbishop 

After an investigation forced him to wait nine months on the island, Bishop Alvares, Bishop Athanasius Paulos of Kottayam and Bishop St. Gregorius Gewargis of Niranam consecrated Vilatte to the episcopate in 1892 and named him "Mar Timotheos, Metropolitan of North America", probably with the blessings of Syriac Orthodox Church Patriarch Ignatius Peter IV. Grafton thought they were deceived by Vilatte statements as to his relation to Grafton and the extent of his work. There are claims that nobody has ever seen the original Syriac language form of this document. According to Brandreth, no Syraic authority had authenticated the signatures depicted in a photostatic copy of a purported translation of the Syraic document.

Likewise, Vignot included an excerpt, of Georges Aubault de la Haulte-Chambre description of Vilatte, from La Connaissance, in which Vilatte was also called the "Old Catholic Archbishop of Babylon".

For its part, the Episcopal Church, on March 21, 1892, having already degraded from the priesthood and excommunicated Vilatte, stated in its General Convention of the same year that it did not recognize his consecration as it took place in a Miaphysite church which does not accept the dogmas of the Council of Chalcedon. The Episcopal Church in the United States bishops declared Vilatte's episcopal orders to be void. The work in the Episcopal Diocese of Fond du Lac has gone on, Grafton had three parishes under three priests, where the Old Catholic services were continued. In all this difficult matter, Grafton consulted his Presiding Bishop and followed his counsel; they did not wish to further a scheme which would make Vilatte a bishop, nor did they wish to offend the Old Catholics of the Netherlands. Williams believed they had saved the Episcopal Church (USA) from what might have become a great scandal.

Returning to the United States and to his work in Door County, he ultimately moved to Green Bay, where he erected his .During this time, Vilatte used two church buildings: St. Joseph's church in Walhain, and St. Mary's mission in Dykesville. He no longer used the Precious Blood mission which belonged to the Episcopal Diocese of Fond du Lac.

A request was sent from Bishop Sebastian Gebhard Messmer of the Roman Catholic Diocese of Green Bay, Wisconsin, to the Premonstratensian abbot of Berne Abbey in Heeswijk, Netherlands, for priests needed to minister to the Belgian and Dutch settlers involved in Vilatte's schism; beginning in 1893, priests whose special mission would be to minister to their spiritual needs were sent. Vilatte "did not give up without a struggle" and "[n]umerous letters from him are in the archives of St. Norbert Abbey, some of them of a threatening nature, all giving indirect testimony to the fact that the early Norbertines were successful in stemming the tide of [...] doctrines and religious practices which were disturbing the peace of the Catholic Belgians on the peninsula." The missionaries succeeded, according to Kirkfleet, by "appealing to the native Catholic instinct of the Belgians rather than by refuting the doctrines of the apostate."

In 1893, Vilatte had a booth at the World Parliament of Religions in Chicago, although he was not an invited delegate. Carlos Parra wrote, in Standing with Unfamiliar Company on Uncommon Ground, that "Despite the spectrum of religious traditions and theological views displayed at the Parliament, not everyone was welcome as a delegate. John Barrows emphatically stated that 'the Parliament was rigidly purged from cranks. Many minor sects, however, tried earnestly to secure a representation, for which there was neither time nor fitness'." Vilatte was not invited. Barrows wrote, in The World's Parliament of Religions, that people sought unsuccessfully to use the parliament for propaganda. According to Parra, "a character like Vilatte embodied the worst possible nightmare about religious indifferentism for a Catholic mind. As a result, he was kept at the margins of the Parliament." He did not take an official part in it.

At this time, Vilatte began his dalliance with Polish Roman Catholics who, dissatisfied with non-Polish Roman Catholic priests, sought to set up an independent Catholic church at the urgings of the priests  and Franciszek Hodur.

Green Bay 

On February 23, 1894, Vilatte bought land and built a small frame structure, his cathedral dedicated to St. Louis IX of France, in the city of Green Bay that year. Later that year, the first convention of the American Catholic Church (1894) (ACC1894) appointed Vilatte as its ecclesiastical head "without arbitrary powers". In 1895, C. Basil, SPB, was listed as rector of St. Louis's cathedral. During this time, Vilatte used three church buildings: St. Louis's cathedral in the city of Green Bay, St. Joseph's church in Walhain, and St. Mary's mission in Dykesville. He no longer used the Precious Blood mission which belonged to the Episcopal Diocese of Fond du Lac.

Shortly thereafter, reduced to penury, Vilatte traveled the East Coast offering the sacraments to, and soliciting monetary aid from, Episcopalians and Roman Catholics, but was rebuffed; in some places he was driven away by the Franco-Belgian Catholics.

In March 1894 he approached Archbishop Francesco Satolli, Nuncio to the United States, who wrote to Messmer that Vilatte wished to reconcile; the next month, Vilatte wrote to Messmer that he was preparing his people for reconciliation. More correspondence took place between Satolli, Messmer and Vilatte. Later that year, the  offered to pay the expense of Vilatte's journey to Rome. His case dragged on for almost four years until, in 1898, Satolli wrote to Messmer that Vilatte was ready to reconcile. But Vilatte remained indecisive. Messmer "realized that there was no hope for a sincere conversion" and wrote to Satolli:

In 1898, the name was changed from St. Louis cathedral to St. John church and A. A. Mueller was listed as rector. On February 10, 1898, Vilatte signed over his cathedral church to the company which foreclosed on him; it sold the church to Messmer on the next day. Messmer's dedication of the church as St. Mary of Częstochowa Church, which took place about two weeks later, included a procession accompanied by a city marching band. Marx and Blied did not state the disposition of St. Joseph's church but wrote St. Mary's mission was lost at the same time. "Vilatte's cathedral was never known as Blessed Sacrament cathedral, as some claim", wrote Klukowski. Another mission was founded in Green Bay; it became the  Church of the Blessed Sacrament in 1908 and a priest ordained by Koslowski was placed in charge.

During this time he consecrated Kaminski and voyaged to Europe where he stop at Llanthony Abbey, to ordain Joseph Leycester Lyne, and "explained that he was in a hurry, on his way to Russia at the special invitation or the Holy Synod of Moscow" but that was improbable.

Messmer disclosed that "Vilatte had admitted to him personally that he had never been in good faith" and both Messmer and Katzer advised the Holy Office to delay passing judgement on his orders to test his sincerity. A Congregation of the Holy Office Consultor, Father David Flemming, issued Vilatte's abjuration statement and a Roman Curia official, Bishop John Joseph Frederick Otto Zardetti wrote to Messmer that Flemming had the case under control. He made a "solemn recantation of his errors" February 2, 1899, but, according to Weber, he "relapsed within a short time" after he outwardly reconciled to the Roman Catholic Church.

By early 1900, Vilatte was in the Benedictine Ligugé Abbey, near Poitiers. "He appears to have told" the monks that he wanted to make a careful study of ordinations in the Syro-Malabar Church, so that he could convince the authorities in Rome of the validity of his episcopate. Aubault wrote a picturesque description of when, in the monastery, he met Joris-Karl Huysmans and Vilatte.

While living as a guest of the Benedictines of Poitiers, Vilatte did not cease his subversive, anti-Catholic activities, although conducted secretly. News of this reached Cardinal François-Marie-Benjamin Richard, Archbishop of Paris, who, on 17 April 1900, circulated a warning among his clergy to be on their guard against men who claimed to be ordained or consecrated by Vilatte.

Emery colony 

The Advocate in Sturgeon Bay reported August 14, 1897, that Vilatte, living in Green Bay, had bought  of land in Price County, Wisconsin, and planned to erect a church and a monastery. "It is his plan to found a colony of his people about the church as a center, the immigrants to come from Germany, Switzerland and portions of this country. [...] He expects to begin operations right away and will have fifty families, in the colony before winter." Soon, according to the September 1, 1897 Milwaukee Journal, a Milwaukee German language newspaper printed a letter from Messmer warning people that women were soliciting funds using Messmer's and Katzer's names without authorization. They were seen and reported; when police arrived, "the priest who accompanied the sisters was called before the chief and questioned and cautioned as to obtaining money by any misrepresentations", according to the Milwaukee Journal.
"These sisters were in Milwaukee last week soliciting aid for the asylum, and in some quarters were denounced as frauds", he said. Then, similar to how the Sturgeon Bay seminary scandal began in 1887, he added, "we shall begin active operations within the next month" although "plans for the buildings have not been entirely completed as yet." He envisioned, "[t]he purpose of the church is to found a monastery" as an "agricultural brotherhood of the Old Catholic Church" with a seminary, and an orphanage to bring children "up to agricultural pursuits". A real estate agent working for the Wisconsin Central Railway added that, during his negotiations with Vilatte he visited his "large and flourishing congregation" in Green Bay. The agent said they purchased "fine agricultural land" covered with hardwood forest. Less than six months later, his diocese lost possession of its foreclosed cathedral.

Chicago 

Vilatte acquired U.S. citizenship then returned to the United States. He settled in Chicago in 1902, and used a mission begun by Father Francis Kanski as his next permanent .

Vilatte used, among other publications, nontrinitarian Jehovah's Witnesses publications for his religious education; in a letter attributed to him, in Zion's Watch Tower and Herald of Christ's Presence, he said: "I do certainly believe that the 'little flock' will be an instrument by whom all the families of earth will be blessed; because all the churches are in a very poor situation and the world in great desolation."

Consecrations 

Vilatte's "unilateral arrogation of status as an Old Catholic prelate did not, [...] reflect objective fact", according to Laurence Orzell, in Polish American Studies. The "European Old Catholics neither sanctioned his consecration nor approved of his attempt to spread Old Catholicism to America." After successive annual conferences of the priests and delegates from parishes, a proposal to elect a Polish suffragan bishop was approved, and in 1897 the convention chose Kaminski from Buffalo, New York.
Kozlowski, a losing candidate from Chicago, called a second convention in Chicago, which elected him as bishop; Vilatte refused to recognise him.
When Vilatte advised the Old Catholics against Kozlowski's consecration, his "ecclesiastical antics" were taken into account and they "probably regarded such advice as all the more reason to proceed with the consecration."
Kozlowski traveled to Europe, and, on November 21, 1897, Herzog, Gul, and Theodor Weber elevated Kozlowski to the episcopate in Bern. Although Vilatte adherents saw a conspiracy, according to Orzell, it remains unclear if Grafton actively promoted Kozlowski's consecration. Herzog, who ordained Vilatte, assured Grafton, in 1898, that "a desire to counter the French 'rouge' served as a major motive behind the Chicago priest's consecration" and asked Grafton to support Kozlowski and "develop friendly relations with him".

Stephen Kaminski 

Kaminski was born in West Prussia. After leaving the army, he forged official documents for which he received a two-year prison term. Upon his release, he emigrated to the United States where he clung to various priests as an organist. He felt called to the religious life and joined the Franciscan order in Pulaski, Wisconsin, but was expelled and moved to Manitowoc, Wisconsin, where he worked in various menial jobs. He was organist at the independent Sweetest Heart of Mary Church in Detroit, Michigan (which Vilatte consecrated in 1893) but later quarreled with and wrote in newspapers against the pastor, and left.

When Vilatte visited Kolaszewski, his vicar general, in Cleveland, Ohio, to dedicate the Immaculate Heart of Mary Church building and cemetery on August 18, 1894, he ordained Kaminski. The dedication ceremonies were marred by a riot, caused by protesters in the streets, that included a stabbing and shooting.

In 1895, Kaminski and a faction of his adherents occupied the Polish parish church of St. Paul, a Roman Catholic church of the Diocese of Omaha in South Omaha, Nebraska, where he conducted devotion "in his own way". Kaminski wounded a man and then shot at the altar to create the impression that he had also been shot at. Later that month, Kaminski was called "a Polish nationalist who posed as a priest" by Elia W. Peattie, in the Omaha World-Herald. She wrote that he "barricaded himself in the sanctuary and used firearms to retain control, wounding Xavier Dargaczewski and Frank Kraycki." Peattie quoted in her article: "The priest, he say: 'I never leave this town till I see the bare bones of this church!' And he is seein' 'em!" It was rumored he started the fire that burned the church, at the end of that month, to a pile of rubble and ashes; Kaminski's faction damaged fire hydrants so there was no way to extinguish the fire. Kaminski was arrested.

Kruszka described the Buffalo situation as being the same that took place in Omaha.

He wrote that, in June 1894, that Alfons Mieczysław Chrostowski's Jutrzenka, in Cleveland, printed that Kolaszewski and Wladyslaw Debski arrived in Buffalo to establish an independent parish.

Hieronim Kubiak wrote, in The Polish National Catholic Church in the United States of America from 1897 to 1980, that the first independent parishes in the United States were organized by German, Irish, and French Catholics. A "pattern of a parish conflict" was already in place when Poles set up their independent parishes. "As long as the conflict continued, the parish most often divorced itself from the jurisdiction of the accused bishop and stood independent of him, which did not mean that the parish did not consider itself belonging to the Catholic Church symbolized by the Pope. In the division with the bishops, the parish kept very strictly to the rules of the norm of religious life, finding in it a further support for the rightness of their cause." Return to the previous state of affairs, exist in isolation and then vanish, or create "a self-determined religious movement" are the three alternative results, according to Kubiak.

According to Kruszka, the causes of this "social ulcer" can be found several years earlier when Poles began immigrating to Buffalo in large numbers. They had only one church prior to 1886; they built an additional church, without waiting for the permission of Bishop Stephen V. Ryan of the Roman Catholic Diocese of Buffalo, but a storm demolished it; they demanded another church and only under pressure from the Congregation for Propagation of the Faith was a second church built. Even so, there was by this time resentment and bitterness among the people which created prejudices against the clergy. Their parish did not develop at all, because everyone thought their pastor, Antoni Klawiter, was morally bankrupt. From 1896 until May 3, 1907, Kaminski was pastor of Holy Mother of the Rosary Parish in Buffalo. According to Kruszka, Kaminski once counted under his jurisdiction a parish in Buffalo, a parish in Chicopee, Massachusetts, and a parish in Baltimore, Maryland.

Kaminski failed to persuade Gul to raise him to the episcopate.
Soon after, Kaminski was to be consecrated bishop by Vilatte, but this was delayed over the fee charged for consecration. It was deliberate and premeditated simony, the act of buying and selling an ecclesiastical office, Vilatte demanded money for the consecration but Kaminski did not have enough to give. Only after Vilatte was bankrupt and had sold his house and cathedral in Green Bay was he less demanding and agreed to consecrate Kaminski.
Kaminski was consecrated, on March 20, 1898, by Vilatte
as suffragan bishop for those Polish priests and parishes which accepted Vilatte's doctrinal reforms. In the end, he received $100 in cash from Kaminski and promissory notes for a few hundred dollars more. Kaminski threatened to take Grafton to court after Grafton publicly criticized him.

"Notices were sent out", according to Anson, that stated both Cardinal James Gibbons of Baltimore and Archbishop Sebastiano Martinelli, the apostolic delegate to the United States, "would assist at the ceremony. It is hardly necessary to add that neither of these prelates put in an appearance."
However, the new bishop fled the United States to Canada because of creditors. He was excommunicated by Rome and he abandoned Vilatte.

On September 9, 1898, Vilatte was excommunicated by Ignatius Peter IV for consecrating Kaminski in a way contrary to the canon law of the Syriac Orthodox Church of Antioch. Anson wrote that in his agreement with Alvares, Vilatte acknowledged that if he "deviated from their Canons and Rules, he would be subject to dismissal from the dignity of Metropolitan." Bishops were consecrated by Vilatte "without authority" from the Patriarch of the Syriac Orthodox Church of Antioch, who "therefore does not recognize such consecrations or their derivative consecrations and ordinations."

Kubiak wrote:

Just before the Revolution in the Kingdom of Poland and wider Revolution of 1905 in the Russian Empire, Stanislaw Osada, in Historya Związku Narodowego Polskiego i rozwój ruchu narodowego Polskiego w Ameryce Północne, wrote in the United States, that Russian agents endeavored to draw believers into Old Catholicism, not for faith but for "implanting in the womb of Catholicism" the basis for Polish discord, to facilitate the Russification of the Catholic Church. Kubiak quoted Osada: "There exists yet another danger, namely that in recent times the leaders of that movement (independent) quite unequivocally help spread among the Polish masses the slogans of the Revolutionary-Socialists."

From 1898 to 1911 he edited and published a weekly Polish newspaper Warta, an organ of his independent church.

He died in Buffalo on September 19, 1911. After his death, the Buffalo center of the independent movement ceased to exist and most of his parishioners affiliated themselves with the Polish National Catholic Church (PNCC), the Scranton center of the independent movement.

Paolo Miraglia 

Paolo Vescovo Miraglia-Gulotti was a priest from Ucria, Sicily, who in 1895 was sent into Piacenza, in Northern Italy, to preach the May sermons in honor of Mary; there he was embroiled in a series of either scandals or conspiracies.
He opened his , Chiesa Italiana Internationale
Paulina Irby wrote, in National Review that it began in a former stable of an old palazzo with church furnishing principally provided by Mazzini's niece. His congregation had just that church, and "is spoken of contemptuously as the congregation of Signor Abbate's stable", she wrote, as the Abbate family own the palazzo.

On April 15, 1896, Miraglia, who resided in Piacenza but was a priest of the Roman Catholic Diocese of Patti, Sicily, was excommunicated for, what was called, his "incredible, audacious, and obstinant scandals which long troubled the Roman Catholic Diocese of Piacenza". That year, Nevin introduced in The Churchman the "modern Savonarola", Nevin wrote "he has placed himself under wise guidance, and will not be apt to do anything rashly or ignorantly" but failed to include any specifics. The following week, The Churchman only hinted at the secular side of that movement by publishing a story from Milan's Corriere della Sera which wrote: "The struggle is now not only religious, but civic. The partisans of the bishop will hear of no truce with the partisans of Miraglia, and whenever they can, remove them from the employments that they hold." Within a year, on August 31, 1897, he attended the 4th International Old Catholic Congress in Vienna.

By 1900, two reformation groups in Italy elected bishops for their churches: one group in Arrone elected Campello as its bishop and the other group in Piacenza elected Miraglia as its bishop. Campello was licensed in 1883 by Bishop Abram Newkirk Littlejohn, of the Episcopal Diocese of Long Island, to work as a priest "wherever there may be lawful opportunity" for Campello's reformation efforts in Italy, and by that time, Nevin already knew Campello for many years. The  refused to consecrate Campello in 1901, according to Oeyen, "because of his limited number of baptisms and marriages and his close relationships with Anglicans, Methodists, and Waldenses". The Church of Utrecht thought Campello was to Protestant.
Miraglia, by then a leader of reform in northern Italy, wrote to Vilatte regarding the movement and consecration. On May 6, 1900, while the Holy See examined Vilatte's case, he consecrated Miraglia in Piacenza. Miraglia was a popular speaker known for his relations with Ferdinando Bracciforti, who represented Milanese liberal Protestantism. On June 13, 1900, the Congregation of Universal Inquisition declared that major excommunication was incurred by both Miraglia and Vilatte. The next day, June 14, 1900, the Alexandria Gazette reported that his anti-Catholicism offended the sensibilities of an American Methodist Episcopal Church in Rome that the "majority of the Protestant congregation interrupted" his discourse "with angry protests against his abuse of the pulpit and the police were finally called to prevent an open riot." In 1901, Tony André Florence, in a report about the liberal movement in Italy presented to the International Council of Unitarian and Other Liberal Religious Thinkers and Workers in London, wrote that Miraglia's "desire to be at the head of a personal movement, after separating him from the Old Catholics whose ideas were akin to his, threw him suddenly into a false path." His consecration by Vilatte "lost him the sympathy of many, and his profession of faith completed their disappointment." Florence wrote that Miraglia's "reformatory movement, therefore, is now in suspense", after he was obliged to refuge abroad.
While the  reported, in The Times, that although the "discreditable incident" of Miraglia "having arrogated to himself the dignity" of bishop-elect and his consecration happened, the work of the "real bishop-elect", Campello, was going on independently, with headquarters at Rome. It is unclear if the two juxtaposed groups were concurrent factions of one movement.

In 1904, the  refused to recognize Miraglia's consecration as valid when he presented himself to the sixth International Old Catholic Congress in Olten, Switzerland.

Already a convicted fugitive who evaded Italian justice, Miraglia was then involved with religious associations in France.
For example, a parish church in Piedigriggio, Corsica, was confiscated by the government from the Roman Catholic Diocese of Ajaccio and devolved to a religious association formed on December 11, 1906. The parish's priest disappeared after he signed a declaration of adherence to the sect. From May, 1907, Jacques Forcioli, a Miraglia ordained priest working for that religious association, conducted schismatic services. In November, a lawsuit was filed by a replacement priest appointed to serve the parish by the Bishop of Ajaccio, against the mayor and Forcioli, demanding the restitution of the church. The court rendered a judgment which condemned the mayor, declared that religious association illegal, and ordered restoration of the property to the 's priest.
Miraglia intended to ordain a priest for Christmas there; but he fled and evaded a French deportation order against him on Christmas Eve. A few days later Forcioli was arrested for stealing items from the church; the mayor and members of the sect were arrested for complicity. Fearing assassination, the mayor refused to implement the restitution on February 25, 1908. Finally, the Court of Appeal in Bastia dismissed Forcioli and restored exclusive possession of the Piedigriggio church property back to the 's priest. On March 14, 1908, La Croix emphasized that the scope of the Bastia decision was of special importance, not only because it was the first judgment on the subject, but also because of the principles of law it invoked.

Vilatte and Miraglia united in a joint effort, and except for the brief interval, when Vilatte unsuccessfully attempted to organize a religious association in France, their work had chiefly been in the Midwestern United States. According to Thomas E. Watson, in Watson's Jeffersonian Magazine, after being "arrested like a common criminal" Miraglia was deported from the United States, on August 4, 1910, "as though he were [...] an enemy to society." Two days before his deportation, the New York Times reported that Miraglia, "self-appointed head" of the Catholic Independent Church of Rome, was detained on Ellis Island "on the charge that he is an undesirable citizen" after being apprehended in Springfield, Massachusetts. He admitted that "while in Piacenza and Parma he served several terms and was heavily fined for libel, and while a professor at the Patti University he forged the signatures of [f]aculty to fake diplomas, which he sold to deficient students." On February 15, 1915, The Evening World reported that he was "charged with obtaining alms under false pretenses", after the Bureau of Charities went to his mission and "found only an empty shack", and arrested along with two of his alleged accomplices by detectives. While in court, a Deputy United States Marshal arrested him "on the charge of writing vicious letters" to a woman.

Others 

Over the next few years Vilatte, according to Joanne Pearson in Wicca and the Christian Heritage, "carried on travelling and consecrating, truly a 'wandering bishop'".

In the middle of 1903, Vilatte was back in South Wales and he raised Henry Marsh-Edwards, a former Anglican priest, to the episcopate with the title of Bishop of Caerleon. The next day both men consecrated Henry Bernard Ventham with the title of Bishop of Dorchester.

The Church of England (CoE) found Marsh-Edwards to be "incapable of holding preferment" after he was required to "answer charges against his moral character." Although Marsh-Edwards was married, Vilatte consecrated him as a bishop. Mandatory clerical celibacy was required by Old Catholics, according to Oeyen, in Switzerland until 1876, in Germany until 1878, and in the Union of Utrecht until 1922. Margrander explains that this third episcopal consecration, of Marsh-Edwards, conferred by Vilatte is noteworthy because the bishop-elect was not celibate; Vilatte's precedent was followed by Gul in consecrating Arnold Mathew several years later.

"It is probable", Anson noted, that Vilatte consecrated Carmel Henry Carfora in 1907. "But there is no documentary evidence", he added, of the event.

In 1913, Vilatte consecrated Victor von Kubinyi in South Bend, Indiana.

Frederick Lloyd 

Frederick Ebenezer John Lloyd was elected coadjutor bishop of the Episcopal Diocese of Oregon in 1905.
Nelson Crawford wrote, in American Mercury, that some laity opposed Lloyd's election and sent a letter containing "numerous objections" to the hierarchy. The letter was influential and Lloyd withdrew his name from consideration. He was not confirmed and was not consecrated by the Protestant Episcopal Church of America (PECUSA).

In 1907, Lloyd was degraded from the priesthood by Bishop Cortlandt Whitehead of the Episcopal Diocese of Pittsburgh and converted to the  that year. In 1909, he reverted to the PECUSA. He was a member of the Illinois legislature.

Vilatte's sect was incorporated in 1915 in Illinois under the name American Catholic Church (ACC); Lloyd was an incorporator along with Vilatte and René Louis Zawistowski.
Vilatte consecrated Lloyd later that year.

At the conclusion of the service Vilatte said to Lloyd:

Lloyd founded his Order of Antioch (OoA), which was, according to Douglas, a group for Anglican clergy who were ordained by Lloyd. Douglas noted that the  attracted "an appreciable, if not large, membership, which was diffused all over England" but did not include an estimate of its membership.

From about 1928 until 1934, Lloyd and Sibley used Saint Sarkis' Armenian Apostolic Church in London. In 1934, the Armenian priest informed his hierarchy, after being apprised by Douglas, that the Syriac Orthodox Church had repudiated Vilatte's apostolic succession; the Armenian Patriarch of Jerusalem then instructed its priest "to cease all relations with Sibley and the Order".

Lloyd and Sibley together operated a parallel business entity, called the "Intercollegiate University" (IU), in which Lloyd was president and Sibley was chancellor.

George Alexander McGuire 

George Alexander McGuire was an Antiguan and a baptized Anglican who graduated from a Moravian theological seminary and served as a Moravian Church pastor on Saint Croix, U.S. Virgin Islands. He was married and had one daughter. After he immigrated to the United States in 1894, during the nadir of American race relations, he was eventually ordained as a priest in the Episcopal Church.
After various assignments, from 1905 he held "the highest position open to a black man serving the church within the United States" as Bishop William Montgomery Brown's archdeacon for colored work in the Episcopal Diocese of Arkansas. The General Convention of the Episcopal Church in the United States of America considered proposals for the creation of black bishops, either in missionary districts independent of local dioceses or as suffragan bishops of local dioceses. Brown, a proponent of social Darwinism, proposed that black people should be racially segregated into a separate denomination. Theodore Natsoulas wrote, in Journal of Religion in Africa, that McGuire wrote an addendum to a diocesan annual report which endorsed Brown's "Arkansas Plan". Hein and Shattuck point out that Brown later apostatized and became a Communist; his "extreme theological and social views" eventually led to his removal.
As Brown's archdeacon, "under his own initiative, he attempted to enact Brown's plan" but, according to Bains, McGuire seemed to have preferred the alternative missionary districts plan and "was frustrated by the racism of the Episcopal Church".
Natsoulas thought that McGuire "probably came away from Arkansas with the idea of an independent black church."

McGuire later received a Doctor of Medicine and served as rector in the United States and on Antigua. In New York, he joined Marcus Garvey's Universal Negro Improvement Association (UNIA) and the African Communities League in 1919, and was elected its chaplain-general the next year. While affiliated for a short time with the Reformed Episcopal Church, when McGuire established the Church of the Good Shepherd, he and his congregation became part of the Independent Episcopal Church which was renamed the African Orthodox Church (AOC). According to David Hein and Gardiner Shattuck, in The Episcopalians, McGuire created the African Orthodox Church "along the lines of what the Conference of Church Workers and Brown had previously proposed." Garvey did not want a hierarchical church like McGuire created.

While Bains called it only "a brief period of estrangement" from Garvey, McGuire actually became involved in a rival organization, the African Blood Brotherhood for African Liberation and Redemption (ABB).

It was an African American self-defense "response to the violent race riots of the Red Summer of 1919" and the Ku Klux Klan. Parascandola called it a "secret paramilitary group".
According to Isaac, much early  history is not documented but she wrote it was inspired by the Irish Republican Brotherhood.
Many of its leaders were Caribbean immigrants and its council joined Comintern.
Briggs, editor of the Amsterdam News, was fired by that newspaper for his support of an "autonomous black nation within the United States".
"The  saw racism as an offshoot of capitalism and viewed Marxism as the solution to the race problem."
Mark Solomon wrote, in The Cry Was Unity, it "enjoyed a burst of good fortune in the fall of 1921 when three  leaders" including McGuire "bolted to the " but "did not widen its ideological appeal." The  "took great pains to demonstrate his legitimacy." Natsoulas wrote that it "was important to its mission that the new church be founded on solid grounds" and quoted McGuire's words that "[t]he Negro everywhere must control his own ecclesiastical organization" yet hold the Apostolic traditions.
He was refused consecration by Episcopal, Catholic, and Russian Orthodox bishops. About the same time, on September 28, 1921, Vilatte consecrated McGuire. The , according to Solomon, contemplated a secret army with weapons "smuggled into Africa by men 'in the guise of missionaries, etc.' as a prelude to gradual liberation of the continent."
But, Jeannette Jones writes, in In Search of Brightest Africa, that the  had a flawed understanding of missionaries because, in fact, the "colonial powers distrusted many black missionaries as race agitators."

McGuire believed that apostolic succession was "essential to authenticate the claims of the ". According to Bains, however, "the questionable authenticity of Vilatte's consecrations haunted their relations with other churches." For example, although three months after being raised to the episcopate, McGuire was granted an audience with Patriarch Meletius IV of Constantinople in New York City, but the  "never gained the desired recognition from a major Eastern Orthodox Church." Bains concluded that McGuire "remained a marginal figure in both the church and predominantly Protestant black America" even with his "claim to apostolic succession that few recognized."

Ordinations

Edward Donkin 

Edward Rufane Donkin was an infamous impostor with worldwide notoriety. He represented himself, at different times, as D Benedetto, Comte Benedetto Donkin, Lord , Benedict Donkin, the cousin of the Earl of Minto, the son of the Duke of Devon.
"In the world's long roll of impostors a prominent place must always be found for 'the Right Rev. Edward Rufane Benedict Donkin, Bishop of Santa Croce, and Vicar Apostolic of the Independent Roman Catholic Church'", begins his obituary in Adelaide's The Chronicle, who committed "a series of frauds" resulting in several imprisonments. Vilatte ordained Donkin. Years later, in 1904, while he represented himself as an Old Catholic Church bishop, Donkin started "what [was] purported to be an Old Catholic Benedictine Oratory" in a house previously "occupied by genuine Benedictines" and "opened almost entirely on credit." By August, "the bubble burst", Warren Fisher, who guaranteed the furnishings, discovered he had been swindled. Donkin "represented that he had been appointed by the Old Catholic Conference as their bishop at Oxford at a salary of £400 a year and that he produced what purported to be the official record of his appointment." Donkin induced him "to guarantee the bill for the furnishing of the Oratory" with a forged check and Fisher was left to pay his guarantee. Fisher then wrote to Vilatte, he responded, and Fisher forwarded his letter to Truth which published it. Vilatte wrote that when Donkin came to him in 1896, "he posed as 'The Rev Fr Dominic, OSA, Church of England Missioner, St Augustine's Priory, London,' and as such he was asked by the Protestant Episcopal clergy of Milwaukee to preach in their cathedral." And, as Vilatte wrote, "I was completely blinded and did ordain him to the priesthood" but "[a]bout eighteen months afterwards his true character was discovered, and I deposed and degraded him". Vilatte explained that a member of his clergy, who he noted was also "humbugged and swindled", introduced him to the impostor, the alias Lord Cortenay, son of the Duke of Devon; that "he 'took in' the clergy of Milwaukee"; that "Donkin never belonged to any 'community' in our Church"; but, Vilatte did not explain why he ordained Donkin, who he thought was a  cleric. Vilatte wrote that later Donkin "posed as a Bishop in Cleveland."

Joseph Lyne 

Vilatte first visited Frederick George Lee of the Order of Corporate Reunion. Lee gave Vilatte a letter of introduction to Lyne.

While Vilatte traveled to Paris to consult with advisers, he interrupted his journey to ordain Joseph Leycester Lyne and another monk at the Anglican Llanthony monastery near Capel-y-ffin, Wales, and the ruins of Llanthony Priory; on July 27, 1898, Lyne, an ordained deacon in the  but "unable to receive orders in his own church" for over three decades, was ordained priest by Vilatte. Rene Kollar wrote, in Oxford Dictionary of National Biography, that "for a time" Lyne "dreamed of establishing a British Old Catholic church." Years earlier, in 1890–1891, while Lyne was on his tour of North America raising funds for his work in England, The Cambrian wrote that his order "is not a Catholic Order, nor a Church of England exactly, but an offshoot of the High Church movement associated with the idea of a revival of the [a]ncient British Church"—which Pearson calls a "literary fantasm"—and his abbey church conducts some services in Welsh. The Cambrian noted that had Lyne addressed the 1889 National Eisteddfod of Wales, in Brecon, on behalf of the Welsh language and of the Ancient British Church and also admitted a Druid, taking the bardic name Dewi Honddu, by the Archdruid David Griffith, also known by his bardic name Clwydfardd; and had spoken for the rights of the Ancient Welsh Church at the English Church Congress held at Cardiff, by the permission of the Bishop of Llandaff.

In 1909, after Lyne's death, two surviving Anglican monks, Asaph Harris and Gildas Taylor, were ordained, in Winnipeg, Manitoba, Canada, where Vilatte was staying during a visit of his missions in that part of North America. Both monks eventually joined the Benedictines of Caldey Island where Aelred Carlyle was Abbot and later Anson was a member.

 William Brothers 

Grafton was a founding member of the Society of St. John the Evangelist who "had strong ideas about the importance of communities of men and their significant contributions to the church" and his "influence on the growth of the religious life", according to Rene Kollar on Project Canterbury, "extended across the Atlantic".
Charles Wood, 2nd Viscount Halifax, wanted Grafton to install Carlyle as abbot of the monastic community living as guests on Halifax's estate in Painsthorpe. On his return travel from Russia in 1903, Grafton visited Halifax in Painsthorpe where he installed Carlyle and ordained him a subdeacon; and the next year, 1904, Grafton ordained Carlyle a priest during a secret but officially documented ceremony in Ripon, Wisconsin.

Both Carlyle and Grafton wanted to establish an Anglican Benedictine brotherhood in Grafton's diocese. Several men expressed an interest, but Anson wrote that Brothers was not among a few Americans at Carlyle's monastery. It is unclear what happened next but, according to Kollar, Carlyle's involvement stopped in 1904. "Apparently little or no contact existed between Carlyle's brotherhood and his American counterpart", noted Kollar. By 1908, Father Herbert Parrish, a  priest in good standing, was prior of the Anglican Benedictine monastery of St. John the Baptist in Fond du Lac. Anson wrote, in The American Benedictine Review, that after Parrish left, it "appears that his followers were replaced or displaced by a group of young men who had been formed into a Benedictine brotherhood" by Brothers in Waukegan, Illinois, located outside Grafton's Diocese of Fond du Lac.

A "rented-house was named St. Dunstan's Abbey" with Grafton self-appointed as "their absentee Abbot"; it was not a monastery listed in the Living Church Annual.

According to Anson, Vilatte ordained Brothers  and later deposed him.

Anson was not certain whether this group was an Anglican religious order, "for by 1911 they were styling themselves 'Old Catholics'".

Brothers was consecrated by Bishop Rudolph de Landas Berghes in 1916 and later deposed by him, for what "appears to have been" to Brandreth, "on the grounds that at the time of the consecration he had not, in fact, received the Orders of deacon and priest."

 Other ordinations 

On June 21, 1907, Vilatte ordained Louis-Marie-François Giraud,
an excommunicated Roman Catholic Trappist monk, for dabbling in magic and the occult.

Shortly after Giraud's ordination, Cardinal François-Marie-Benjamin Richard, Archbishop of Paris, warned about apostate priests who were celebrating Mass under cover of a religious association directed by Vilatte. Richard said,

He then excommunicated Vilatte a second time.

 St John's Home 

Vilatte operated a private home for the care of homeless children, St John's Home, in Chicago since 1897. Claude Basil, known as "Father Basil", was in charge of this institution until three indictments, charging "crime against nature", were found against him by the Cook County, Illinois grand jury in June 1903. The indictments were based on accusations of three boys who formerly lived in the home. Basil was arrested. An inspector from the State Board of Charities investigated the home on August 6, 1903, after the St John's Home applied to the Illinois Secretary of State for incorporation. According to the report, the inspector went to the given address and found the house vacant but upon inquiry was directed to a different location. A new two story frame building with modern conveniences was found at that address. Vilatte was in charge and assisted by two other men, "Father Francis" and "Brother Panchand"; the signatures of all three men appear on the incorporation application. "He informed me that the home was organized in 1897, and that its object is to help poor children who have no homes, no matter what religious denomination they belong to, and that the institution is supported entirely by donations and collections." They cared for eighteen children—17 boys and a girl, the sister of three boys. The inspector recommended that the girl, probably 7 or 8 years old, should be taken out of the home, which had no provision for the separation of the sexes, and placed elsewhere. Furniture was moved in the day before the inspection, and consequently the home was in disorder, but the inspector noted the floors woodwork walls and ceiling appeared to be clean. Vilatte informed him that a doctor was immediately called in case of sickness. The children wore donated clothing and all those of school age attended the public school. Two boys were locked in rooms and the inspector was told by Vilatte that "they were doing penance for running away".

The report includes part of an 1898 letter from Grafton, about Vilatte's character, published in Diocese of Fond du Lac, a newspaper. Grafton warned about Basil in that letter:

To further discredit Vilatte in that letter, which Orzell calls one of his "more vituperative public pronouncements concerning" Vilatte, Grafton also asserted "he was morally rotten; a swindling adventurer [...] reported to me for drunkenness, swindling, obtaining money under false pretenses and other crimes, and as a notorious liar" with "somewhat exceptional gifts as an imposter" and associated with questionable people:

Vilatte stated that Basil no longer had a connection with the home at the time of inspection. The board did not find conditions sufficiently favorable to warrant recommending for the St John's Home incorporation; the board recommended that articles of incorporation be withheld by the Secretary of State. He was tried on one of these indictments and found guilty of a "crime against nature" on September 30, 1903. At the time of the report, he was held in jail while his appeals pended. The Secretary of State declined to incorporate St John's Home. Basil requested "friends and acquaintances" back in Sturgeon Bay to send financial contributions, to Vilatte, for his appeal.

 Des Houx 

In 1904, diplomatic relations between the French Third Republic and the Holy See were broken.

In 1905, all Churches were separated from the State and authorized to form self-supporting corporations for public worship. Those religious associations were designations given to certain "moral persons" or associations which, by the 1905 French law on the Separation of the Churches and the State, the French Third Republic, wished to incorporate in each diocese and parish to receive as proprietors church properties and revenues, with responsibility of taking care of them. They were based on the principle that the State should only recognize distinct religious associations, having corporate status, formed in each parish for the purpose of worship "in accordance with the rules governing the organization of worship in general". All buildings used for public worship were made over to the religious associations; in the absence of religious associations, buildings remain at the disposal of the clergy and worshipers, but an administrative act must be secured from the prefect or the mayor. By Article 8, it belonged to the Council of State, a purely lay authority, to pronounce upon the orthodoxy of any religious associations; the revenues were to be subject to state regulation.

One such group was the work of Henri Durand-Morimbau, a publicist, better known under his pseudonym of Henri des Houx. Durand-Morimbau, a university agrégé, first worked with Bishop Félix Dupanloup at the liberal newspaper La Défense. Pope Leo XIII realized the need of a papal journal through which he could communicate with the foreign press, and he consequently created Journal de Rome. Journal de Rome, inspired by the French Cardinal Jean Baptiste François Pitra and directed by des Houx, grew critical of Leo XIII's liberal views. The New Zealand Tablet describing Journal de Rome, wrote that, it "distinguished itself for its fierce denunciations of the Italian Government and its equally fierce support, [...] of the Papacy." In 1885, Pitra defended des Houx in an open letter but Journal de Rome did not fulfil Leo XIII's expectations and was closed. Des Houx then returned to Paris, where he became editor of Le Matin, a French daily newspaper, in which he retaliated with articles against the Pope and the Curia. In 1886, his memoir  was placed on the Index Librorum Prohibitorum. But he returned to Leo XIII's favor by publishing, in 1900, .

By his August 10, 1906, encyclical, Pope Pius X stated that the law threatened to intrude lay authority into the natural operation of the ecclesiastical organization; Georges Goyau explains, in the Catholic Encyclopedia, that the Holy See feared that religious associations would furnish the State with a pretext for interfering with the internal life of the Church, and would offer to the laity a constant temptation to control the religious life of the parish.  prohibited the formation not only of these religious associations, but of any form of association whatsoever "so long as it should not be certainly and legally evident that the Divine constitution of the Church, the immutable rights of the Roman pontiff and of the bishops, such as their authority over the necessary property of the Church, particularly the sacred edifices, would, in such religious associations, be irrevocably and fully secure." The  ecclesiastical authority had forbidden the only kind of corporation which the State recognized as authorized to collect funds for purposes of worship or have the right of ownership for purposes of worship. The State considered previously legally-recognized churches, as no longer existing; and, in cases where no religious associations were incorporated, took over the property of the churches and turned the property over by decree to the charitable establishments of the respective municipality; in such cases, the Church lost this property forever. After the publication of the encyclical, des Houx supported a policy opposed to that which he held twenty years earlier in Rome.

On August 19, 1906, he started a press campaign, in Le Matin, titled: "France for the French". He wrote that the hierarchy of the Catholic Church were unable to save either themselves or churches and the faithful French must now do so; des Houx appealed, to all the faithful, for the formation of a "League of French Catholics", whose purpose was to preserve traditional worship churches, religious foundations and properties currently threatened by decommissioning of churches; the group mission was to facilitate the formation of religious associations. He wrote that the majority of bishops disguised their opinions and were forced to abdicate their conscience and their control; that priests were treated like dumb and terrified slaves; and, that they did not have the right to abdicate a wealth which was accumulated by the piety of their ancestors. By September 23, 1806, Léon Daudet ridiculed, in Libre Parole, what he calls des Houx's "".

The large circulation of Le Matin made the failed attempt widely known and drew public attention to the acts and the words of Vilatte; Le Matin and des Houx were unable to get people to take their religious association seriously. Vilatte was involved but could not keep des Houx's "French Catholic Church" viable, which des Houx had established in Paris, in the chapel of a former convent.

By January 1907, des Houx wanted to create a schismatic Church in Paris and recruited Vilatte, though Vilatte was believed to be supported by Aristide Briand, the Minister of Cults and one of the leaders of the liberal anti-Roman movement. At des Houx's insistence, Vilatte returned to Paris early in 1907. On February 24, 1907, Washington Times-Herald translated Vilatte, from Le Petit Parisien, as saying to the French: "You are suffering, [...] but you do not know why you suffer, because you are not clear-sighted and practicalbecause you are not Americans. But I am an American, and I am the man you want to set things straight for you."

Vilatte together with a few laymen founded a religious association in the Church Notre-Dame-de-Lorette, Paris that filed a demand to receive the church and its possessions. In the meantime he resided in the former Barnabite convent. A public Mass was partly celebrated in the convent chapel by Roussin, from the diocese of Toulouse, in the presence of Vilatte. Much disorder and tumult followed upon Roussin's appearance in the pulpit, which he was speedily forced to quit by missiles flung at him. Vilatte tried to quell the storm from the sanctuary but was also obliged to retreat. The religious association was "founded at the instigation of the Masonic government officials", according to Kirkfleet.

Around the same time, he was involved in another scandal. If Vilatte did not exist, wrote a columnist in Le Rire, he would have to be invented for the lenten vaudeville foolishness played out in his church; he satirized the incident of a bailiff, who, in the name of a woman who loaned 3,000 francs to Vilatte, presented himself at the chapel and seized Vilatte's personal belongings, including his miter and crosier. He wrote of Vilatte's humiliation—not even having a miter to put on his head. While the bailiff searched for property to seize, he also found embarrassment and shame; the church porter had brought a fourteen-year-old girl, whom he had met on the boulevards during Mardi Gras, into his room above the chapel. Snob ended his satire with the sentence: "Desolation of the desolation!"

The law was modified by a law passed January 2, 1907, permitting exercise of religious worship in churches purely on sufferance and without any legal title; and further by a law passed March 28, 1907, classifying assemblages for religious worship as public meetings, and abolishing in respect of all public meetings the anticipatory declaration required by the Law of 1881 which the  refused to make.
Appolis underscores that, ultimately, without the patronage of even a single French episcopate and only a very small number of schismatic priests in service, the "League of French Catholics" completely failed. It is significant that the modernists, active at that time, paid no attention to the religious associations movement, according to Appolis. He concludes that, while Briand was initially hostile toward religious associations, he later only used them for a short time as a "machine of war" against the Holy See but saw little result and abandoned them. By 1920 diplomatic relations between the French Third Republic and the Holy See, broken in 1904, were resumed. This method was used until 1923 when a new method of administering church properties was inaugurated.

 Vilatteville, Mexico 

Vilatte was involved in at least three speculative real estate ventures near the Rio Grande. In each venture he sought out customers who would travel to and settle on land purchased from the venture.

In 1906, according to articles published in The Donaldsonville Chief and The Brownsville Daily Herald, settlers could purchase  or  plots of land from a  tract that a venture had planned to purchase near Raymondville, Texas. The Brownsville Daily Herald wrote that Vilatte traveled in a private railroad car with several investors. A. M. Davidson, a general immigration agent at Chicago for the Houston and Texas Central Railway, purchased  of land and the Brownsville Railroad donated  more, on which a monastery was planned, at the center of the planned settlement. Vilatte recruited settlers; one article said he would select the settlers and "see to it that no undesirable immigrants are brought in." He began calling himself "Archbishop Vilatte, of Texas".

In 1910, with a group of Society of the Precious Blood religious, led by Taylor, who had joined the society after his ordination, Vilatte went to Candelaria, Texas.

Vilatte felt it was a blessing to live there. He wrote:

On October 1, 1910, Vilatte sailed to Europe to recruit settlers.

Unfortunately for the settlement, the Mexican Revolution also started in 1910. After Porfirio Díaz was ousted from power and exiled in France, Abraham González, Governor of Chihuahua, redistributed the settlement as part of nationalization and agrarian land reform in Mexico.

Taylor stayed in Chihuahua for a few years where, according to Anson, "he worked with schismatic clergy who were being sponsored by Vilatte as a nucleus of a national church." Vilatteville was a precursor of Mexican schisms. Although Joaquín Pérez's 1925 Mexican Catholic Apostolic Church (ICAM) was dismissed as a "comic opera reformation" sponsored by Plutarco Elías Calles, Matthew Butler notes, in The Americas, that previously other schisms were attempted such as by Venustiano Carranza's revolutionaries and that Vilatteville was built in Chihuahua about 15 years before. It's unclear from Butler if Vilatteville influenced Mexican schisms but Butler wrote that Pérez was consecrated by Carfora.

Other groups also conducted operations in Mexico. Cross wrote that before the First Vatican Council, "the American Episcopal Church had supported dissident Catholics in Mexico.

In 1911, another venture was "Uncle Sam City", in Socorro County, New Mexico Territory, with the Ascott Valley Land and Improvement Company of El Paso, Texas. On at least . In a full-page advertisement, in the August 26, 1911, issue of the El Paso Herald, the venture dubiously claims, among other things, that it "gives the first investors a 1000 percent profit within a few years" and "only an infinitesimal part of the water applied to lands in this valley is lost to evaporation" as well as "cattle are rarely afflicted with diseases".

 Founding the American Catholic Church 

The name "American Catholic Church" was used to identify more than one unique entity.

Vilatte founded his independent Christian denomination, American Catholic Church (ACC), soon after he was consecrated. According to The New York Times, Edward Randall Knowles was Vilatte's first ordination. That  had a schism when Knowles desired to be consecrated a bishop. Vilatte wrote to The New York Times, that he had "been pestered with applications from clergymen of other churches for episcopal consecration." I "would render myself ridiculous", wrote Vilatte, "were I to proceed to consecrate Bishops in a hurry." Vilatte rejected Knowles' request and Knowles resigned. Vilatte explained that three canonical conditions were not met:
Vilatte was alone, "and the law of the Church is that there should be at least three Bishops to consecrate another"
Knowles was married, "whereas in all the Eastern churches a Bishop must be a monk"
Knowles was too young, he "has not attained the canonical age"
Vilatte complained against attempts to force him "to act against" his "better judgment" and declared: "I am, and intend to remain, faithful to the laws of our orthodox Church."

Vilatte was mocked, in The Sacred Heart Review, as being the "sole proprietor and General Manager of the new Old Catholic Church in America" confronted by a schism. While the "great 'neatness and despatch of Knowles' ordination was ridiculed and his judgment, for "resigning from his church because he can't be a bishop all at once", was questioned. "Knowles may ask, [what] is the use of having a [...] church of your own if you are going to let the rules stand in your way?".

He was prepared to sail to Europe to consult with Loyson, Herzog, and the  about the feasibility or desirability of starting missions in America. He abandoned his trip and waited for Vilatte. They met in Philadelphia, and Knowles was ordained in West Sutton, Massachusetts.

On June 20, 1893, The New York Times published that Knowles had received a letter from Loyson. "The letter shows that the Old Catholic Episcopate in Europe have sided with [...] Knowles as against [...] Vilatte, and have entirely repudiated him."

The name "American Catholic Church" was also used, from 1894, by a group of Polish parishes, at first associated with Vilatte, which were organized at Immaculate Heart of Mary Church in Cleveland.

On February 11, 1895, The New York Times reported that Knowles was a guest at Holland House, London and was "a priest of the Old Catholic or Syrian Church" who will in Egypt "study the Coptic and Greek systems". It further reported that, "There is a feeling among the Old Catholics and others who sympathize with them that the present administration of the Church is not vigorous or progressive enough. Hardly any advance has been made since the consecration of Archbishop Vilatte [...] Negotiations were carried on with disaffected Polish Catholics [...] but they failed [...] through a lack of discretion and tact." It went on to report that the "facts will be laid before the Patriarch by Knowles" and that reforms will be suggested. "In point of fact", Orzell wrote, "most Polish dissidents proved more willing to make use of Vilatte's episcopal services at blessings and confirmations than to accept his leadership and embrace his curious blend of Eastern and Western Christian theology." Margrander wrote that Poles did not accept Vilatte's doctrinal reforms so he withdrew his approval of their movement; he also wrote that Vilatte was convinced that their motive was a "deliberate defiance of the canonical authority" of their bishops, rather than reform, so he "advised them either to accept fully and freely the Old Catholic principles, or to return to the Roman Church."

Statistics about Vilatte's Old Catholic Church (OCC) sect showed its tiny size. Henry Carroll's The Religious Forces of the United States Enumerated, Classified, and Described, summarized United States Census data from 1890 to 1910. It showed the  had at most three ministers, five edifices and 700 members; Moreover, the 1910 United States Census data showed that prior to 1910, the  disintegrated and ceased to exist; Carroll wrote that "a number of denominations, all quite small, have disappeared, including [...] the Old Catholic Church, and other insignificant bodies." Carroll's summaries did not list a sect named "American Catholic Church".

a council of churches open to all persons having their residence in this country, whatever may be their nationality;
united in the fidelity to the true faith in our Lord Jesus Christ, who is the sole Head of the Universal Church and our High Priest;
imbued with the American Spirit of democracy and liberty;
a branch or section of the true (Christian) Catholic Church of God, with its own Synod and Conference of Bishops.

Partially self-reported statistics about Vilatte's denominations were included in the United States Census Bureau's Religious Bodies, 1916 edition. They show two denominations associated with Vilatte were grouped under the name "Old Catholic Churches".

Of the two denominations under Vilatte's leadership, first reported in Religious Bodies, 1916 edition, the larger was the Old Roman Catholic Church (ORCC) with an episcopal see in Chicago. Miraglia was associated with this organization. It was in close fellowship with the  but a distinct organization. It claimed 12 organizations served by 14 ministers, with a membership of 4,700 with 11 church edifices and four parsonages. The organizations held church service mostly in foreign languages; principally Polish and Russian with others using Portuguese, Lithuanian, and English.

It was incorporated in 1915 in the State of Illinois. Lloyd was associated with this organization. The denomination was formed for the special purpose of bringing Roman Catholics into the Old Catholic movement. It was in close fellowship with the  but a distinct organization. It claimed three organizations served by seven ministers, with a membership of 475 with one church edifice and one parsonage. The organizations held church service only in English.

After Vilatte's death, only one denomination derived from Vilatte was included in Religious Bodies, 1926 edition, in the report's Old Catholic Churches group. Religious Bodies explained that, by then, "none of these American bodies or leaders are connected with or recognized by the Old Catholic Churches of any part of continental Europe, nor are their Orders or Apostolic Successions derived directly, if at all, from European Old Catholic Churches" and added a "caution against misinterpretation" of the term "Old Catholic Churches". According to Religious Bodies, these entities are no longer either connected with Old Catholic Churches of continental Europe, which "repudiated all responsibility for or connection with" bishops who derived their consecrations from the consecration of Mathew, or with the Syriac Orthodox Church of Antioch. "Of the many bishops that have been consecrated in this group, [...] most have assumed other names and titles and founded separate churches for themselves by civil incorporation. For most of these no statistics are published, for the reason that the Census Bureau collects its statistics directly from congregations rather than from the officers of corporations." So, "direct comparisons between the bodies as reported at the two censuses are impossible, [...] because of numerous organic changes", according to the United States Census Bureau. Which also stated "a reorganization since the census of 1916 makes it impossible to identify the whole group with any of the bodies formerly presented", in the 1916 data, under the name "Old Catholic Churches"; the reorganized  claimed 11 organizations served by an unreported number of ministers, with a membership of 1,367 with two church edifices and one parsonage.

The notice named the  specifically as an example of such schismatic bodies.

According to James R. Lewis, in The Encyclopedia of Cults, Sects, and New Religions, the  "was taken over by bishops with theosophical leanings" after Vilatte's death.

 Reconciliation and death 

The , printed that Vilatte returned to France in 1922 with dollars. What is certain, according to Appolis, is that money assisted in the election of the socialist Cartel des Gauches during the 1924 French legislative election. Vilatte had friends in the new majority.

In 1925, he returned to France for the last time. "It is possible", Anson wrote, that he hoped that Giraud or Jean Bricaud "would befriend him as the virtual founder of their sects." Following the election, the Catholic Church was very concerned about the outbreak of anticlericalism that accompanied the new majority. After conferring with Pope Pius XI and his Secretary of State, Cardinal Pietro Gasparri, Father Eugène Prévost was given the task of obtaining Vilatte's abjuration. Prévost quickly succeeded.

On June 23, 1925, La Croix reported that Vilatte took a solemn vow of abjuration at the hands of Archbishop Bonaventura Cerretti, Apostolic Nuncio to France, in Paris on June 1, 1925; and published his abjuration text. Vilatte wrote:

A week later newspapers announced that Vilatte, with an American boy-servant, was staying at the Cistercian Abbey of Sainte Marie du Pont-Colbert, Versailles.

He actually retired to the monastery on June 6, 1925, where he was neither permitted to offer Mass nor recognized as a bishop. He lives in a small house adjoining the convent, but with its own entrance on the road.
In accordance with established  practice, he was treated as if he had never been ordained; so, his only satisfaction, in Appolis' opinion, was dressing like clergy. In doing so, the  did not assert that his orders were not valid, it just refused to discuss the matter. He wore a simple cassock "without any episcopal insignia." "Out of politeness he was addressed as ''", according to Anson, and for the rest of his life he "led a quiet and secluded life in a cottage within the monastery grounds, waited on by his boy-servant." Years after Vilatte's death, M. Francis Janssens, abbot-general of the abbey, wrote:

Anson wrote that there were rumors that Janssens offered Villate a home "at the request of Pope Pius XI" and gossip that Vilatte was granted a pension of 22,000 francs annually. According to Appolis the Roman authorities denied that rumor but it did not seem doubtful for Appolis, that the  gave Vilatte financial assistance that it often gives to converts. "Stories went around Paris that Pius XI had been prepared to allow Vilatte's re-ordination" but Vilatte declined the offer because he was "convinced that he was a bishop as well as a priest."
According to Kirkfleet, an article, in The Salesianum, about Vilatte "raises a well-founded doubt about the sincerity of his reconciliation to the Church, and cites an attempt by him to 'ordain' a young man to the priesthood shortly before his death." According to Anson, Emanuel-Anatole-Raphaël Chaptal de Chanteloup, Auxiliary Bishop of Paris, wrote to Brandreth that, Vilatte secretly ordained and consecrated a novice at the monastery. "The ridiculous affair was kept quiet", wrote Anson, but others dismissed it as a rumor.

According to Appolis, Vilatte hoped that he would be allowed to say mass at the time of his episcopal jubilee.

He died of heart failure on July 8, 1929, and was buried in a Versailles' cemetery, without episcopal vestments and with a requiem mass celebrated for a layman.

"Shortly after the funeral both his American servant and his private papers vanished."

 Occultists 

Eugen Weber wrote in The Historical Journal that by the nineteenth century, the Church's hold on everyday life had been severely weakened and, "[e]mancipated from formal religious observance, new believers sought new systems to replace the old, adopted the language of the old to present the new".

An extensive underground of secret organisations flourished in the ensuing religious anarchy following the dechristianisation of France during the French Revolution, to such an extent that the 19th century could be characterised as,

Joanne Pearson describes, in Wicca and the Christian Heritage, these "cults and counter religions" as often "combining heterodox Christianity, occultism, Freemasonry and spiritualism", and considers the Johannite Church founded by Bernard-Raymond Fabré-Palaprat as an exemplar of sects that were revivals of heresy; they were linked with "gnosis such as Catharism and the Templars, and sought to return to the simplicity of an imagined primitive Christianity." Pearson notes the Johannite Church attracted lapsed Catholic bishops and priests. The paradox of 19th century French religious revival, alongside anti-clericalism and irreligion, is characterised by David Blackbourn, in Comparative Studies in Society and History, as "a patchwork affair that took place alongside widespread dechristianization".

He explains that after Bricaud, "in contact with all the European occult underground of his time", was consecrated by Giraud interest in occultism grew in Gnostic Churches which consecrated Freemasons and occultists as bishops.

According to Guénon, the  "seems to have had only an ephemeral existence" but was unambiguously linked to Theosophists. He quoted Annie Besant, from The Theosophist, who described "the little known movement called the Old Catholic" as a "living, Christian, Church." The English edition of Guénon notes that, in Russia, the term Living Church "was meant to denote a 'modernist' organization set up with aid of the Bolshevik government in order to compete with the Orthodox Church, the intended implication being that the Orthodox Church, by contrast, must be considered a 'dead Church'. Doubtless", Guénon's editor thought, "Besant had precisely the same intention regarding the Roman Catholic Church."

Bricaud was consecrated as Tau Johannes, Gnostic Bishop of Lyon, in 1901.

On June 21, 1907, Vilatte ordained Louis-Marie-François Giraud, an ex-Trappist monk but then a ceremonial magician associated with the Universal Gnostic Church.

Bricaud was consecrated by Giraud, on July 21, 1913, into the Vilatte stream.

Vilatte Orders

The awards or decorations associated Vilatte include the Order of the Crown of Thorns (OCT) and the Order of the Lion and the Black Cross (OLBC). Both are condemned by the Holy See and Italy lists both as illegal decorations. The International Commission on Orders of Chivalry (ICOC) includes a list of ecclesiastical decorations in its Register since 1998, which only "possess full validity as awards of merit or honours within the respective Churches which have instituted them" but excludes bodies "which are often created as a purely private initiative, and which subsequently place themselves under the 'protection' of a Patriarchal See or Archbishopric."

Order of the Crown of Thorns

Louis-François Girardot and Vilatte originated a pair of  groups. The two separately founded  orders had the same name but different origins and were combined, although it is not clear what that meant. Also: 

These foundation stories were not believed by some during Vilatte's lifetime; Guénon wrote that "dignitaries of this Church have a mania for titles of nobility as others have for fantastic decorations; thus [... Vilatte] invented the 'Order of the Crown of Thorns'." The organization acknowledges the lack of verifiable facts about the monastery but says that some documents were destroyed in a house fire in 1918 and other documents were seized by the Vatican in 1929 after Vilatte's death.

In 1957, Girardot recanted his 1883 foundation story.Author unknown, Title unknown, Intermédiaire des Chercheurs et Curieux (in French) (Paris) 21. Sep 1971. . Google Books 

1883 foundation story

The  was reputedly founded in 1883. According to the San Luigi organization, after the French protectorate of Tunisia was established in 1881, France sought to colonize the Ottoman Empire's Fezzan province as part of the Scramble for Africa. A small group of monks settled in Ghadames in 1883. The organization says that there is no documentation about their past. It is unclear if the monastery was a satellite of a mother abbey, if it was ever considered stable enough and large enough to be elevated to the rank of an abbey, if they had the canonically required number of twelve monks to elect an abbot, if his election received the approbation of their provincial prior, if after his ecclesiastical confirmation he received abbatial blessing from any bishop in communion with the Holy See, or even if any of their actions were sanctioned at all. Nevertheless, the monks called their monastery the Abbey-Principality of San Luigi and they claimed sovereignty, as a theocracy, over the surrounding secular territory. Disease was endemic; attempts to convert the local Muslim population to Catholicism were rejected; and in less than a year, on August 2, 1884, the monastery was sacked and at least one monk was murdered. Five monks, including what the organization calls their third abbot, José Mendoza, survived and were exiled. Mendoza was somehow elected by less than the canonically required twelve monks. Without mentioning the Sahara and Sahel situated between Ghadames and the Sudd, the organization says that the monks traveled across the Sudd and arrived in the Kingdom of Bunyoro-Kitara on March 15, 1885. There, the organization says, Omukama Kabarega of Bunyoro granted territory to the monks to settle and establish a monastery. The organization says that Kabarega conferred a title, Mukungu of the Chieftainship of the Ancient Abbey-Principality of San Luigi, upon Mendoza. In 1888, all the monks died from an epidemic, except Mendoza, who then abandoned the monastery in Bunyoro and returned to Europe. The organization says that "legalization by a French government official established the recognition of the Abbey-Principality by the French state" when Seine-Port Mayor Eugène Clairet was involved in a transfer of titles from Mendoza to Girardot. On May 7, 1899,again with Clairet's involvement, Girardot transferred those Mendoza titles to Vilatte.

The organization says that the monastery, of at least seven monks, "was constitutionally independent as a theocratic state" and a "colonising power" under which "the local population had no political rights whatsoever" and "were to be subjugated under the absolute rule" of the monastery. The organization confers reputed titles of nobility The organization also describes itself as an Old Catholic church. The organization believes itself to be the legitimate de jure government-in-exile of its former territory in the Fezzan. "The Abbey-Principality aims ultimately to secure the territorial restoration of the original Abbey-Principality in Libya, but is aware that political and related considerations are likely to preclude this objective for the time being". The organization also believes that it is also theoretically empowered to open embassies although it has not done so as yet.

1891 foundation story

The  was also allegedly founded in 1891 and authorized by Peter IV, Patriarch of Antioch. The  asserts that because "none of the Eastern Orthodox Patriarchal Sees possess any type of direct Sovereignty, [...] the decorations instituted by them may not be deemed as equivalent to those bestowed by the Roman Pontiff not only in his Spiritual Capacity but also in his temporal position as Sovereign of the Vatican City State."

Order of the Lion and the Black Cross

Valensi affair

The Valensi affair was a scandal in 1910s France, named after Guillaume Valensi. It resulted in arrests and convictions for fraud and trafficking illegal decorations. Documents and blank diplomas of decorations of various orders were seized which included a number of blanks printed in Arabic and others bearing what purported to be, the signatures of living and dead prominent French statesmen. Five men were placed on trial, excluding Valensi, who was judged to be not mentally competent. The investigation was begun after a client became suspicious of the authenticity of the signatures on the diploma of the Tunisian order of Nichan Iftikhar that he purchased and reported the whole affair. Valensi and an accomplice were arrested on charges of fraud and trafficking illegal decorations. According to The New York Times, the  reported that the trafficking in decorations scandal spread as far as Berlin were many well-known persons were decorated. As it spread, searches were carried out against Valensi and his accomplices which led to several arrests and the revelation that duped officials in Lille had been "hoaxed in the most complete and amusing manner" by Valensi and two accomplices into thinking that they were Moorish notables.

Vilatte was implicated in the Valensi affair by being identified as the Marie Timothée of the Principality of San Luigi, whose signature appeared on diplomas of the  trafficked by Valensi. Vilatte responded to a  article about the diploma by saying that the article discredited him by incorrectly identifying him as the signatory. He said that his  had nothing in common with the diploma from the Principality of San Luigi. Vilatte said that his religious name was Mar Timothéus I and not Marie Timothée.

In 1913  printed an article about the Valensi affair based on Maurice Pujo's , which connected it to organized crime. Pujo listed another Vilatte-affiliated group, the Grand Prix Humanitarian of France and the Colonies, networked with a Georges Brassard conglomerate which included the make-believe Free State of Counani. According to seized documents, Valensi was Chancellor to the Consul-General in Paris for the make-believe state. Pujo included an excerpt from a letter written by Collet, secretary of most Brassard companies, to Adolphe Brézet, "president of the Free State of Counani", which stated that Brézet would receive, among several blank diplomas sent to him, a blank "officer of San Luigi" diploma.

Condemnation by the Catholic Church

The Holy See had stated twice, first in 1953 and again in 1970, that it does not recognize either of the orders. Guy Stair Sainty wrote that an "increasing number of such bodies" troubled the Holy See which "issued statements condemning such 'Orders'" in 1935, 1953, 1970 and 1976. He noted that the "most complete recent condemnation" was included in Orders of Knighthood, Awards and the Holy See, by Archbishop Igino Eugenio Cardinale. The self-styled orders are described as "originating from private initiatives and aiming at replacing the legitimate forms of chivalric awards." The statement points out that, they "take their name from" extinct Orders or "which had been planned but were never realized or, ... which are truly fictitious and have no historical precedent at all." While they "style themselves as autonomous", these "private initiatives" qualify their names, according to the statement, with terms to "increase the confusion of those who are not aware of the true history of Orders of Knighthood and of their juridical condition." For example, "these alleged Orders claim for themselves ... such titles as ... Chivalric, ... Sovereign, Nobiliary, Religious, ..." "Among these private initiatives, which in no way are approved of or recognized by the Holy See, one can find alleged Orders such as" The Crown of Thorns and Lion of the Black Cross. The statement explains that, "to avoid equivocations ... because of the abuse of pontifical and ecclesiastical documents, ... and to put an end to the continuation of such abuses,  harmful consequences for people in good faith, we ... declare that the Holy See does not recognize the value of the certificates and insignia conferred to the above-named alleged Orders."

  Recognition of ordinations 

Vilatte was ordained prior to the 1889 establishment of the Old Catholic Churches' Union of Utrecht and its .

From its inception, the  decided "to act as a body whenever the Old Catholic Churches of the Union of Utrecht were confronted with questions pertaining to relationships with other churches" and as an outcome formalized its decisions as well as refined its view of episcopacy.

According to Anson, the  published a  statement on June 23, 1925, that "Vilatte had never been a priest of this body nor any other genuine Old Catholic Church". Cerretti's reply to that  statement was published in the July 11, 1925, . Cerretti wrote that regardless of the 's denial, the documents show that Vilatte was ordained by Herzog in Bern and was consecrated by "three Jacobite Bishops" in Colombo. Anson thought Vilatte "must have been pleased that he had managed to convince" Cerretti "of the facts of his priesthood and episcopate, even though they were irregular."

Anson wrote that "stories went around Paris", after his 1925 recantation, that the pope was "prepared to allow Vilatte's ordination to the priesthood , but that he had refused the papal offer, being convinced that he was a bishop as well as a priest."
"The pope agreed to let Vilatte be ordained a priest, but that offer was refused", wrote Marx and Blied. "If this proposal was really made, a vexing question about Old Catholic orders is raised. Lack of data precludes any discussion." "In practice, the Church ignores orders received by apostates from schismatic bishops", wrote William Whalen, in Faiths For the Few. "These men, if reconciled to the Church, need not recite the Divine Office or even observe celibacy." "No formal pronouncement on the validity of his orders was ever made by the Roman authorities." According to Marx and Blied, Merry del Val's opinion was that Vilatte was a genuine bishop. But Merry del Val "maintained that throughout his episcopal career Vilatte had so 'commercialized' ordinations and consecrations, that he himself was not able to regard them [those which Vilatte conferred] as valid."

 Works or publications 

Most works by Vilatte are not readily accessible. Based on WorldCat searches, some are only a single holding at one library.

 
 
 

 Notes 

 References 

 Further reading 

 
 Alexis Tancibok, Early Independent Catholicism in Context: A Re-examination of the Career of Archbishop Joseph René Vilatte (1884-1929)'', Durham University, 2020.

External links 

 Gallican.org webpage in French – Gallican National Church
 Biography on Gnostique.net

1854 births
1929 deaths
Clergy from Paris
American Episcopal priests
Old Catholic bishops
Canadian Christians
Converts to Roman Catholicism
Former Russian Orthodox Christians
French Christians
French emigrants to Canada
French Roman Catholics
Syriac Orthodox Church bishops
People temporarily excommunicated by the Catholic Church
People from Brown County, Wisconsin
Presbyterian Church in the United States of America ministers